Halseyella is a monotypic moth genus in the subfamily Lymantriinae described by Nye in 1980. Its only species, Halseyella flavicollis, was first described by John Henry Leech in 1890. It is found in the Chinese province of Hubei.

References

Lymantriinae
Monotypic moth genera